Cyperus luzulae is a species of sedge that is native to parts of southern parts of North America, most of Central America and northern parts of South America.

See also 
 List of Cyperus species

References 

luzulae
Plants described in 1786
Flora of Mexico
Flora of Belize
Flora of Guatemala
Flora of Argentina
Flora of Brazil
Flora of Bermuda
Flora of Bolivia
Flora of Colombia
Flora of Costa Rica
Flora of Cuba
Flora of Ecuador
Flora of Guyana
Flora of Haiti
Flora of Honduras
Flora of Jamaica
Flora of Nicaragua
Flora of Panama
Flora of Paraguay
Flora of Peru
Flora of Uruguay
Flora of Venezuela
Taxa named by Anders Jahan Retzius
Flora without expected TNC conservation status